Line 16 may refer to:
 Line 16 (Beijing Subway)
 Line 16 (Hangzhou Metro)
 Line 16 (São Paulo Metro)
 Line 16 (Shanghai Metro)
 Line 16 (Shenzhen Metro)
 Line 16 (Wuhan Metro)
 Line 16 (Xi'an Metro)